Akuku is a mountain peak in Cordillera Apolobamba.

Name 
Akuku means peek-a-boo in Polish and was chosen by the first to ascend because it is a fun name that also resembles the names of nearby peaks.

References 

Mountains of La Paz Department (Bolivia)